K0  may refer to:
 Spectral class K0, a star spectral class
 the 1965 first model of the Honda CB450 motorbike
 the Grothendieck group in abstract algebra
 the Lateral earth pressure at rest
 the neutral kaon, a strange meson with no charge in nuclear physics
 K0 may refer to Khinchin's constant
 K0 the order-zero graph